Dingley Dell Football Club was a short-lived English association football club based in the London area in the late 1850s and early 1860s.

History

Dingley Dell F.C. was founded by members of the Dingley Dell cricket club, which was named after the cricket team in a fictitious village described in The Pickwick Papers by Charles Dickens. The club's captain, lawyer George Turner Sills, had formed a side at the start of 1858 made up mostly of students from the University of Cambridge, which played at Westminster School in February.

The Dingley Dell club played its first match against Westminster School at Vincent Square on 24 November 1858 in the earliest known football fixture in the London area.  The side which included at least two players (the Rev. Bonner and W. Williams) who played in Sills' Cambridge XI side at the start of the year.  The club was the most active non-school team in the London area in the five years before the Football Association was established in 1863, and was considered the strongest non-public school club in 1862.

The club's earliest games were all played against Westminster or Charterhouse schools.  The matches included one against Westminster, under the name of G. Sills' XI, which took place over two days.

Matches under Dingley Dell rules

On 15 February 1862, the club played Surbiton F.C., in the first known match between selective clubs, rather than school or work entities.  As this match pre-dated the Football Association, the rules were open to negotiation, and the match was played under the Dingley Dell rules, which banned the carrying of the ball, and had goals scored by kicking the ball under a tape.  

Three days later, the club played the War Office, which was also a founder member of the Football Association under the name Civil Service F.C., at Beaufort House, winning 1–0; this was presumably under Dingley Dell rules.  On 22 February 1862, 12 members of the club played Harrow School under the latter's rules, losing by 2 bases to 0, due to "an insufficient knowledge of the rules of the Harrow game".  Over the 1861–62 season, the club's record was played 12, won 3, drawn 4, and lost 5.

The club suffered a blow before the start of the 1862–63 season when an accident meant Sills was forced to retire.  The club had an active season, perhaps with fixtures already arranged at the start; however, the club was not represented at the initial Football Association meeting at Freemasons' Tavern on 26 October 1863, when the FA was formed; however Theodore Bell of Surbiton may have been a de facto representative of the club.

Football Association

The formation of the Football Association, and implementation of a set of laws that were similar to the Dingley Dell laws, seemed to have taken away some of the need for a club described as "the M.C.C. of football" (in reference to being a force for implementing a common set of rules); also Sills' incapacity, plus the formation of other clubs, contributed to the club falling out of the regular fixture round.  The club is known to have played only played three reported matches after the Association rules were implemented and it was not a member of the FA.  The club's final reported fixture was against Westminster School on 11 February 1864, which was the first game of the season for which Sills was fit enough to play.  The club seems to have ceased to exist after that, with at least four regular players (R.D. Cleasby, G.A.Paley, and the Wharton brothers) playing for the Crusaders club later in February.

Dingley Dell rules

Although no full record of the Dingley Dell rules survives, in December 1861 Bell's Life magazine published a letter from "D.D." setting out the following:

By 1862, the Dingley Dell rules had settled the number on each side as 11, and included a rule on corner-kicks.

References

Defunct football clubs in London
Defunct football clubs in England
Association football clubs established in the 19th century
Association football clubs established in 1858
Association football clubs disestablished in 1864